The California Cadet Corps (CACC), originally called the California High School Cadets, is a component of the California Youth and Community Programs Task, Task Force Torch. The California Cadet Corps is a paramilitary youth organization in California open to students in the college, high school, middle school and elementary school grades.

Role and purpose
The six objectives of the California Cadet Corps are to develop leadership, citizenship, patriotism, academic excellence, basic military knowledge, and health, wellness, and fitness. The Cadet Corps motto is "Essayons," a word in the French language meaning "Let us try."

The CACC's primary goal is not to send all their cadets to the military. More of the CACC's cadets have become astronauts, chemists, doctors and other professions than have joined the military.

The CACC's primary goal was originally to prepare young men to be officers in the United States Military, after Brigadier General Edwin A. Forbes saw that the Germans already had such programs before World War I. However the program has since shifted its goal. Now, they prepare young men and women not only for the service but also for the business world where communication and leadership skills are essential.

History of the California Cadet Corps 

The CACC was founded on 5 April 1911 by Brigadier General Edwin Alexander Forbes. At that time every California high school was required to have a California Cadet Corps unit if at least thirty-two students at the school were interested in the program.

The California Cadet Corps was created by an act of the Legislature on 5 April 1911.  The California High School Cadets program was designed to prepare young men for service in the California National Guard.  In 1935, the Legislature changed the organization's name to the California Cadet Corps.

The program flourished during both of the World Wars and beyond, until the start of the Vietnam War. At that time there was criticism of the military and CACC's funding was cut by the state of California. The program was basically "dead" all through that time period. The CACC regained its funding in 1999. Since 1999 the Cadet Corps has begun a slow rise back up and as of 2007 there were 8,000 cadets in the state.

Authorization

The California Cadet Corps is referenced under sections 500 through 520.1 of the California Military and Veterans Code (CMVC). All colleges, community colleges and high schools may form companies of cadets on their campuses whenever at least 100 students voluntarily enroll in the program. California boards of education, school principals and college presidents are required by law to cooperate with the adjutant general to implement California Cadet Corps programs.

Organization
The California Cadet Corps  is the flagship youth program of the California National Guard. Oversight of the Corps on the state level is provided by the Headquarters Staff, led by the executive officer of the California Cadet Corps, currently Colonel (CACC) Michael Smith. Officers of the California Cadet Corps are commissioned as officers in the inactive or active militia under the auspices of the Military Department, State of California.  There are currently 10 normal brigades plus tenth corps, which is the training brigade.  In any brigade there are usually one or more battalions and within each battalion there are generally 1 or more companies.  A company consists of 2 platoons.

Cadet ranks and appointments

Ranks
Except for rank used for elementary schools (grades 5 and below used Grizzly 1 to Grizzly 4 rank) the ranks of the California Cadet Corps closely resemble the ranks of the United States Army.  The main difference in names is in the enlisted ranks, where the "private (PVT1)/(E-1)" rank is replaced with "recruit (RCT)", another difference in the enlisted ranks is that where the "private (PVT2)/(E-2)" rank is replaced with "cadet (CDT)", the last different naming for enlisted ranks of the CACC is where "private first class (PFC)/(E-3) rank is replaced with "cadet first class (CFC)". Other spottable different is that, cadets' ranks who are from junior noncommissioned officer (NCOs) and up is differentiated by the "C/" present before the ranks' initials, for example, a cadet corporal ranks' initials is "C/CPL", when a normal corporal rank in the Army is "CPL", a cadet sergeant rank is "C/SGT" while the army's sergeant rank is "SGT". Last different is the rank appearances of cadet commissioned officers' ranks, up to cadet colonel "C/COL" and a relatively new change were made to the "cadet first sergeant (C/1SG)" rank somewhere during 2016/17. To start with, the CACC has changed the C/1SG rank to now where the triangle between the "Chevrons" (the arrows) and the "Rockers" (the straight bars below), which is the army's 1SG rank, is changed into a diamond. The difference between cadet commissioned officer, 2LT (second lieutenant) and an adult 2LT is that the gold bar, replaced with a gold disc, the disc itself being called a "pip". The cadet 1LT (1st lieutenant) rank is a silver "pip", replaced from the adult 1LT's silver bar. The adult CPT (captain) rank insignia is two silver bars connected with each other by two thin lines composed of the same material, which earned it a nickname "railroad track" because it does look like a railroad track, is replaced with two silver "pips" connecting with each other in the cadet captain (C/CPT) rank. The adult MAJ (major) rank insignia is a gold oak leaf, which is replaced with a gold diamond for the cadet major (C/MAJ) rank. The adult lieutenant colonel (LTC) (colonel is pronounced as "kernal") rank insignia is a silver oak leaf, which is replaced with a silver diamond for the cadet lieutenant colonel (C/LTC) rank. Lastly on this list, the silver eagle of the adult colonel rank (COL) is replaced with two connecting silver diamonds for the cadet colonel (C/COL) rank. Less than 10% of all cadets ever in the CACC program ever managed to achieve a rank of cadet colonel.
 
To pass, the cadets [in this case cadet sergeant (C/SGT), cadet second lieutenant (C/2LT), and cadet major (C/MAJ)] must score an 80% or better to pass the exam part.  For officers and NCOs testing to staff sergeant (C/SSG) or higher, cadets must go before a promotion board of three adults, usually prior military or Cadet Corps personnel.  The cadets are inspected on their uniform preparation and are quizzed on overall knowledge of the Cadet Corps, and in the case of officers, leadership philosophy and principle.

Appointments
There are many jobs that cadets can hold in the Corps.  The lowest level of leadership is the squad leader.  They are usually in charge of 4-14 cadets, depending on the size the unit allows.  After that would be the platoon sergeant (PSG).  They are in charge of the welfare of their cadets, as well as running day to day platoon operations.  PSGs are also in charge of teaching their new platoon leaders (usually newly commissioned lieutenants) how platoons work, and to be a liaison between the platoon leader, the first sergeant, and the squad leaders.  Platoon leaders are the first level of officer leadership.  Usually lieutenants, but commonly warrant officers or NCOs if the unit strength is low.  Platoon leaders are responsible for leading the platoon and supervising the squad leaders and platoon sergeant.  After that positions are as follows:

Company first sergeant
The company first sergeant (C/1SG) is an assistant to the company commander and is in charge of all of the PSGs.  They are usually selected from the highest-ranking noncommissioned officers (NCOs) and are generally the oldest and most experienced NCO in the company.

Company commander and executive officer
The company commander (CO) is the highest-ranking officer in the company, usually a C/CPT.  He/she is in charge of leading the company and training the executive officer (XO) to take his place the following year.  The CO is generally a senior in high school.  The executive officer is a junior in high school that is training to be the CO the next year.  He/she is in charge of running day-to-day operations and to make sure all of the leaders under his/her command are communicating.

Battalion sergeant major
The battalion sergeant major (C/SGM) essentially has the duties of the first sergeant, but at a higher level.  He/she is in charge of managing all of the first sergeants in the battalion, as well as being an aide and advisor to the battalion CO. He/she also take charge of the battalion's drill teams, flag details, the leader (US flag bearer) of the color guards of the battalion, and anything that have to do with military drills and ceremonies. The sergeant major position is a disciplining leadership position, they enforce military courtesy and customs, they ensuring that company commanders and company first sergeant know their duties, they are the direct communicator between the brigade command sergeant major and the battalion, they command battalion's inspection [Note that the AGI (Annual General Inspection) is commanded by the state HQs Command Staff, and is not in the power of the battalion sergeant major], they are in charge of training officers, and they work with the BNXO (battalion executive officer) to collaborate on command and staff work.

Battalion commanding officer and executive officer
The battalion commanding officer is usually a C/LTC, and has the same responsibilities of a company commander, but like a C/SGM, it is on a greater level.  The battalion CO is responsible for leading his company commanders and training the battalion XO.  The battalion XO (authorized C/MAJ) is in charge of running day-to-day operations and to make sure all of the leaders under his/her command are communicating.

Brigade command sergeant major 

A brigade command sergeant major mostly had the same duty as a battalion sergeant major, but at the brigade level. They are the key player for training and enforce military drills and courtesy throughout the brigade. A brigade sergeant major is usually a cadet sergeant major or cadet command sergeant major, authorized for rank up to cadet command sergeant major (C/CSM)

Brigade commander 

Brigade commanders, always the highest-ranking and the best cadet commissioned officers of the brigade, coordinate and communicate with all the battalions, battalion command and staffs, and the command and staffs in the brigade, to help create, plan, and executes events. They also communicates the order of the HQs (10th brigade/10th Corps) to the rest of the brigade, and assist in publishing orders to the HQ. The maximum authorized rank is C/COL (cadet colonel).

S-Shops
S-shops ARE the cadets on staff for a company, battalion, brigade, and Headquarters (10th Brigade/10th Corps) responsible for the welfare of cadets.

Opposition
The California Cadet Corps is explicitly opposed in Los Angeles Unified School District by the Coalition Against Militarism in Our Schools, which in their mission statement writes that they are "...working to eliminate the Junior Reserves Officer Training Corp in our High Schools and the California Cadets in our Middle Schools, along with the school community.

In popular culture
In the television series Saved by the Bell, the show's protagonist, Zack Morris, agrees to take part in a pilot program organized by the California Cadet Corps in order to avoid detention.

References

External links
Official Website of the California Cadet Corps

1911 establishments in California
American military youth groups
Education in California
Military in California
Military units and formations established in 1911
Non-profit organizations based in California
State agencies of California